The farm at Great Porthamel, at Talgarth in Powys, Wales, comprises a range of buildings including the farmhouse, the gate tower and an agricultural building. They form the remnants of a major medieval manor that was the principal seat of the Vaughan family. The complex has been described as "one of the more remarkable mediaeval houses of Wales". The gatehouse is a Grade I listed building, and a scheduled monument, while the farmhouse is listed at Grade II* and the agricultural building at Grade II.

History
The estate at Great Porthamel was established by Sir William Vaughan, created the first High Sheriff of Brecknockshire in 1539. The Porthamel Vaughans, a junior branch of the Vaughans of Tretower Court, came to prominence and wealth as minor personages at the Tudor courts of Henry VII and Henry VIII. Rowland Lee, Lord President of the Marches, wrote to Thomas Cromwell that William Vaughan was “a man to be cherished”. Sir William began building at the end of the 15th, or the early 16th centuries, and a contemporary account records the gatehouse forming the entrance to a "a strong wall-embatteled" enclosure. Cadw's Coflein record gives a date for construction of 1536.  The farmhouse also dates from this time, although reconstruction took place in the later Tudor era, including the addition of a two-storey porch.

Robert Scourfield and Richard Haslam, in their 2013 volume, Powys, of the Buildings of Wales series, note that much of the Porthamel enclosure had been destroyed by the 19th century.

The farm at Porthamel is the site of an anaerobic digester, following a controversial, but successful, planning application in the early 21st century, which saw the development opposed by the Brecon Beacons National Park authority.

Architecture and description
The Porthamel complex has been described as "one of the more remarkable mediaeval houses of Wales". The farmhouse is of two storeys and five bays. The tower is approximately 8m in height. It has an upper chamber with stairs leading to a castellated look-out point. It is a Grade I listed building and a Scheduled monument. The farmhouse is listed at Grade II*, while the agricultural building is Grade II.

Gallery

Notes

References

Sources
 

Buildings and structures in Powys
Grade I listed buildings in Powys
Grade II* listed buildings in Powys
Talgarth